Rio Rattler is a 1935 American Western film directed by Bernard B. Ray.

Plot summary 
A dying Marshal gives his identification papers to Tom. After Tom arrives in town, the papers drop and are found during a fight so Tom decides to assume the Marshal's identity. Mason, the chief, now sends Rattler, the killer of the Marshal, to also kill Tom. But when he overhears Tom is a fake, they change their plans and now go to arrest Tom for the murder of the Marshal.

Cast 
Tom Tyler as Tom Denton
Eddie Gribbon as Soapy
Marion Shilling as Mary Adams
William Gould as Banker Mason
Tom London as Ranger Bob Adams
Slim Whitaker as "Rattler" Brown
Lafe McKee as "Pop" - Hotel owner
Ace Cain as Henchman Sam Hall
Frank Ellis as Man owing Pop $25

Soundtrack

External links 

1935 films
American Western (genre) films
American black-and-white films
1935 Western (genre) films
Films directed by Bernard B. Ray
Reliable Pictures films
1930s English-language films
1930s American films